The Rosary is a 1922 American drama film directed by Jerome Storm and written by Bernard McConville. It is based on the 1910 play The Rosary by Edward Everett Rose. The film stars Lewis Stone, Jane Novak, Wallace Beery, Robert Gordon, Eugenie Besserer and Dore Davidson. The film was released on January 16, 1922, by Associated First National Pictures.

Cast       
Lewis Stone as Father Brian Kelly 
Jane Novak as Vera Mather
Wallace Beery as Kenwood Wright
Robert Gordon as Bruce Wilton
Eugenie Besserer as Widow Kathleen Wilson
Dore Davidson as Isaac Abrahamson
Pomeroy Cannon as Donald MacTavish
Bert Woodruff as Captain Caleb Mather
Mildred June as Alice Wilton
Harold Goodwin as Skeeters Martin

References

External links
 
 

1922 films
1920s English-language films
Silent American drama films
1922 drama films
First National Pictures films
Films directed by Jerome Storm
American silent feature films
American black-and-white films
1920s American films